Adler von Lübeck (German for Eagle of Lübeck), also called Der Große Adler or Lübscher Adler, was a 16th-century warship of the Hanseatic city of Lübeck, Germany. Adler von Lübeck was one of the largest ships in the world at her time, being 78.30 m long overall and displacing 2–3,000 tons.

The war galleon was built by Lübeck during the Northern Seven Years' War to escort her convoy of merchant ships in the Baltic and North Sea. However, Adler von Lübeck was never put into action, since Lübeck had already entered peace negotiations with Sweden at the time of the ship's completion. After the Treaty of Stettin (1570), Großer Adler was converted into a freighter for trade with the Iberian peninsula. The ship was dismantled in 1588 after twenty years of service.

Dimensions 
The Lübeck chronicler Peter van der Horst — relying on the building contract of the ship — gave the following dimensions of Adler von Lübeck:

 Length of head knee: 10.45 m (18 ells)
 Length of keel: 36 m (62 ells)
 Length from stern post to stern post: 49 m  (85 ells)
 Length from head knee to stern gallery: 64 m (111 ells)
 Length overall: 78.30 m (256.9 ft)
 Clear beam inboards: 13.84 m (24 ells)
 Beam inboards: 13.84 m (48 ft)
 Beam: 14.50 m
 Height overall: 62.15 m

The gun arrangements of the ship have been preserved in the artillery manual of the artillery master Hans Frese.

Gallery

See also
 List of world's largest wooden ships
 List of ships of the Hanseatic League

References

Further reading 
In chronological order

Articles & monographs
Van der Horst(e), Peter (1676): "Beschreibung von der Kunst der Schiffahrt – Zum andernmahl auffgeleget und mit einem Anhang vermehret, worin beschrieben wird der Anfang und Fortgang der Schiffahrt", 2nd. ed., Schmalhertzens Erven, Lübeck (PDF)
Pâris, Charles François-Edmond (1882-1892): "Le Musée de Marine du Louvre", Paris
Pâris, Charles François-Edmond (1962): "Souvenirs de Marine", Partie 1-5, Hinstorff, Rostock [Reprint]
Nance, Robert Morton & Anderson, Roger C. (1912): "A Sixteenth Century Ship of Lübeck", The Mariner's Mirror, pp. 152–153
Arenhold, Lüder, (1913): "The Adler of Lübeck", The Mariner's Mirror, pp. 152–153
Anderson, Roger C. (1913): "Guns of Adler of Lübeck", The Mariner's Mirror,  pp. 153, 222, 250, 285 & 345
Kloth, Herbert: "Lübecks Seekriegswesen in der Zeit des nordischen 7-jährigen Krieges 1563-1570", Zeitschrift des Vereines für lübeckische Geschichte und Altertumskunde, Vol. 21 (1923), pp. 1–51 & 185-256 plus Vol. 22 (1923–25), pp. 121–152 & 325-379 Details on a number of details on construction, rigging, equipment and crew of the Adler von Lübeck are scattered throughout the article
Anderson, Roger C. (1939): "The Mars and the Adler", The Mariner's Mirror, pp. 296–299 [+plates]
Reinhardt, Karl (1943): "Der Adler von Lübeck", Die Seekiste - Schiffsmodellbau, Berlin, Iss. 12
 Pietsch, Ulrich (1982): "Die Lübecker Seeschiffahrt vom Mittelalter bis zur Neuzeit", Catalogue of the Museum für Kunst und Kulturgeschichte der Hansestadt Lübeck, Lübeck 
Kirsch, Peter (1988): "Die Galeonen. Große Segelschiffe um 1600", Bernard & Gräfe Verlag, Koblenz, p. 67

Modern model ships
Reinhardt, Karl (1938): "Adler von Lübeck", Zeitschrift des Vereines für lübeckische Geschichte und Altertumskunde, Vol. 29, Iss. 2, pp. 293–332
Marquardt, Karl Heinz (c. 1965): "Adler von Lübeck AD 1565", 35 pp., 4 drawings Ship model of the Graupner company
Aarhuus, Norbert (1982): "Adler von Lübeck", Modellbauwerft, Verlag für Technik und Handwerk, Baden-Baden, Iss. 6, pp. 496–500 Article on the Graupner model
Author unknown (1984): "Adler von Lübeck. MBH-Miniplan 67", Modellbau-Heute (MBH), Militärverlag der DDR, Berlin, Iss. 7, p. 16
Author unknown (1994): "Adler von Lübeck", Modellbauwerft, Verlag für Technik und Handwerk, Baden-Baden, Iss. 8, p. 27

External links 

 Deutsche Museumswerft: Adler von Lübeck 
 Technical data of the Adler von Lübeck 
 Hanseatic league

Naval ships of Germany
Hanseatic League
History of Lübeck
Naval battles of the Northern Seven Years' War
16th-century ships
Ships built in Lübeck